is a passenger railway station located in the city of Tokushima, Tokushima Prefecture, Japan. It is operated by JR Shikoku and has the station number "M01".

Lines

Layout
The station consists of a side platform serving a single track. There is no station building, only a shelter on the platform for waiting passengers. A flight of steps leads up to the platform from the main road, rendering the station non-wheelchair accessible.

Adjacent stations

History
Japanese National Railways (JNR) opened Awa-Tomida as an added temporary stop on the existing Mugi Line on 1 November 1986. With the privatization of JNR, JR Shikoku took over control and upgraded it to a full station.

Passenger statistics
In fiscal 2019, the station was used by an average of 494 passengers daily

Surrounding area
Japan National Route 11
Japan National Route 55
Tokushima Prefectural Office
Tokushima Central Park

See also
List of railway stations in Japan

References

External links

 JR Shikoku timetable

Railway stations in Tokushima Prefecture
Railway stations in Japan opened in 1986
Tokushima (city)